Korean citizens are issued a national ID card when reaching age 17. This card contains a unique Resident Registration Number ( jumin deungnok beonho). The first six numbers indicate the citizen's date of birth, while the last seven numbers includes information such as where the birth was registered. This resident registration number is used by Korean citizens and foreign nationals for all forms of record-keeping.

History

'Identity card' in the history of Korea 
In Korea, the origin of Identity Card appeared in Joseon Dynasty, it was called Hopaebeob(호패법). Joseon Dynasty, which achieved a centralized national, it was mandatory to have an ID card for all people to effectively maintain the Class system, easy to getting tax and administration. After that The Korea Empire which succeeded Joseon Dynasty made ID card in the modern sense, Since the current identity cards were made in the Republic of Korea period.

'Citizenship certificate' the forerunner of 'Identity card' 
There was a need to distinguish between friend and enemy since independence in 1945 the Government of the Republic of Korea established and soon after the outbreak of the Korean War. Thus first Residents ID card was issued to distinguish between friend and enemy in 1950. In Residents ID card, Detailed personal information such as address, occupation, and weight, blood type, etc. were written to fit the special circumstances of wartime.

The first ID card 

Social Security numbers have its origins in the social security legislation in 1962. At that time its dual enrollment to citizens and residents was available so it was not performed properly. Then in 1968, after the ‘Kim Shin -jo incident’, when North Korean special forces stormed The Blue House, it amended the Social Security Act because Spy identifies were given a number to each citizen.

Social security number at the time consisted of 12 digits. In November 21, it was issued by former President Park Chung-hee identity card No. 1 to No. 110101-100001, and Mrs. Yuk Young-soo, was issued a second call to a number 110101-200002. At this time the front row was made with a number of regional issues, the back has been issued Order.

The beginning of the current 13-digit social security number 
It is a 13-digit number such as this was written in 1975. Front row was the combination of date of birth, gender and birth backseat area, It was held a little more privacy than before. At this time there began to arise regulations that must be presented if the police officer asked.

Configuration

Overall Components 
In current Resident Registration Act, ID card must be mounted name, ID photo, fingerprint, published date and resident registration agency. But if the resident wants applicating blood type, it can be applicated on the basis of Presidential Decree. (2 of Art. 14 of the Residents Registration Law)

Holographic anti-forgery 

There is Taegeuk(태극) shape in the left corner, and Earth shape(Pacific Rim) in the bottom center. There is Taegeuk shape surrounded by a wavy line. And there is “대한민국” letter which crescented top to left, and pattern which crescent in the low left to center right with this The Taeguk.

Status of ID card issued

Issuance 
In Resident Registration Act, Mayor, Supervisor, Alderman shall issue to 17-ages-old who jurisdictions residents. The person who aged 17-years-old must proposes of ID card issued to Act, Mayor, Supervisor. (3 of Art. 24 of the Residents Registration Law) The ID card is issued by computerized resident information center of the Ministry of Public Administration and Security, at the request of the Mayor, Supervisor, Alderman, and it has been grant and delivered to City. (1 of Art. 28 of the Residents Registration Law) If it lost or damaged, the name or date of birth or gender changed, insufficient of ID card entry column, difficult of identification by changed the face or etc., that time replacement of ID card. (3 of Art. 40 of the Residents Registration Law) In this time, People who have an identity card is 40 million people, and it is estimated that about 350 million per year issuance.

Usage 
ID card is estimated that is used more than hundreds of thousands of cases a day. Usually more than 60% get the description from the financial institutions are utilizing this ID card, and it is also used on ARS or Online Applications amounts to about 10 million per day.

See also
Resident registration number

References

External links
 'Proving that the Republic of Korea citizens History of ID card' Written by NATIONAL MUSEUM OF KOREA CONTEMPORARY HISTORY
 'History of the Social Security Number' Written by Korea Times

South Korea
Government of South Korea